Samuel Rathbone Edge (22 May 1848 – 27 September 1936)  was a Liberal Party politician.

Edge was elected MP for the Newcastle-under-Lyme at a by-election in 1878. However, he lost the seat two years later at the 1880 general election.

References

External links
 

Liberal Party (UK) MPs for English constituencies
UK MPs 1874–1880
1848 births
1936 deaths
Members of the Parliament of the United Kingdom for Newcastle-under-Lyme